The Final Adventure is the fifth collaboration album by Murs and 9th Wonder. It was released on November 13, 2012, on Jamla Records. The album features only one guest appearance by Rapsody.

Critical response 

The Final Adventure was met with generally favorable reviews from music critics. Andres Vasquez of HipHopDX gave the album four stars out of five, saying "It’s clear that Murs and 9th Wonder had a task here: finishing their saga as strongly as they started it. With The Final Adventure, the duo does just that, crafting an album that speaks on a variety of topics over soulful instrumentation, much like on 3:16. This time, they managed to tie up loose ends, showing the growth of the boy who once hustled recyclables (“H.U.S.T.L.E.”) now proudly acknowledging that he is behind Paid Dues. The boy who was alone on “The Pain” became the smiling groom on “Walk Like a Woman.” And while this may not be the end of their individual careers, it's safe to say it's over for them as a duo. “That’s all, folks. That’s all that she wrote,” Murs says as the album closes. “It’s over and it’s finished. We gon’ end it on a good note.” And that’s precisely what they did."

Christopher Minaya of XXL gave the album an XL, saying "The true standout of The Final Adventure is the aptly titled “It’s Over.” While the first verse takes on affection, the second verse exhibits Murs confronting sucker MCs seeking handouts. The song's—and album's—final verse finds parallel theme to the last verse of the opening track “Get Together,” and ironically emblematic of the duo's start and end, for they're concluding the saga on a “good note.” It's identical to how they began their journey with Murs 3:16: The 9th Edition. Though fans might mourn for the ending, it was a praiseworthy run, and certainly a great closing."

Track listing
All songs produced by 9th Wonder.

Personnel
Khrysis: Mixing, Mastering
Murs, 9th Wonder: Executive producer
Marco Oliva: Photography
9th Wonder: Recording engineer
Warren Hendricks: Direction & layout

References

External links

2012 albums
Murs (rapper) albums
9th Wonder albums
Albums produced by 9th Wonder